Creemore Aerodrome  is an aerodrome  northwest of Creemore, Ontario, Canada.

References

Registered aerodromes in Ontario
Transport in Simcoe County
Buildings and structures in Simcoe County